Pra River may refer to:
Pra River (Ghana)
Pra (Russia), a tributary of the Oka